The Textile Engineering College, Noakhali is a textile technology learning institute situated in Noakhali, Bangladesh and is affiliated with Bangladesh University of Textiles (BUTEX). It is one of the seven textile engineering colleges in Bangladesh which are collectively funded and controlled by the Directorate of Textiles, Ministry of Textiles and Jute. Textile Engineering College, Noakhali is an engineering educational institute in Bangladesh offering Graduation in different core of Textile Engineering with affiliation of Bangladesh University of Textiles and govern of Ministry of Textiles & Jute, Bangladesh.

History

British Weaving School
During the British colonial rule from 1911 to 1929, 33 peripatetic weaving schools were established in East Bengal to meet the requirements for a textile technician by offering an artisan-level six-month course. Begumgonj Textile Engineering College, Noakhali is one of them; it was established in 1918. In 1968 it was upgraded to District Weaving School offering a one-year course and in 1981 District Textile Institute offering a two-year certificate course in textile technology. But the certificate course was not acceptable to the industry.

Textile Institute, Noakhali

In 1993 a three-year diploma course was introduced under Bangladesh Technical Education Board (BTEB) which was treated as a milestone for the textile education. The duration of this course was extended to four years in 2001. The college was upgraded in 2007 to offer a BSc in textile engineering. The course is affiliated by the Bangladesh University of Textiles.

Campus
Noakhali Textile Engineering College, a two-minute walk from Choumuhani, besides to from Dhaka to Noakhali roadway. Very charming and shady in the very heart of Noakhali.

Academics 
NTEC offers a four-year bachelor's degree program in textile engineering. It is one of the seven textile engineering colleges run by Bangladesh University of Textiles.

 Faculty of Fashion Design and Apparel Engineering:
 Department of Apparel Engineering
 Department of Textile Fashion and Design
 Faculty of Textile Chemical Engineering:
 Department of Wet Process Engineering
 Faculty of Textile Engineering:
 Department of Fabric Engineering
 Department of Yarn Engineering

LAB Of TECN

 Dyeing Lab
 Cotton Spinning Lab
 Jute Spinning Lab
 Fabric Lab
 Garments Lab
 Textile Testing & Quality Control Lab
 Computer Lab 
 Mechanical Workshop Lab
 Physics Lab
 Chemistry Lab

LAB Machine

 Washing Machine. 
 Sample Dyeing Machine. 
 Sample Screen Printing Machine. 
 Light Box.
 Jet Dyeing Machine.
 Stone Washing Machine.
 Zigger Dyeing machine.
 Pad dry machine.
 Compacting Machine.
 Winch dyeing machine.
 Super Steamer.
 Flat bed Screen Printing Machine.
 Hank yarn Dyeing Machine. 
 Boiler. 
 Padding Mangle Machine. 
 Transfer printing machine.
 Hydro Extractor Machine.
 Calendering Machine.

Library
Where there are various reference books on textiles as well as science fiction, religious and educational books. In addition, the library has the facility to read various types of papers including daily, weekly, monthly, yearly.

Citations

Textile schools in Bangladesh
Begumganj Upazila
Engineering universities and colleges in Bangladesh
Universities and colleges in Noakhali District
Colleges affiliated to Bangladesh University of Textiles